The Thüringenliga is the sixth tier (VI) of the German football league system and the highest league in the German state of Thuringia. Until the introduction of the 3. Liga in 2008 it was the fifth tier of the league system, until the introduction of the Regionalligas in 1994 the fourth tier.

Overview 
The Thüringenliga was established in 1990 as the Landesliga Thüringen from fourteen clubs as a highest league for the German state of Thuringia, which was established after the league in October 1990, and the Thuringia Football Association, TFV. It comprised the area of the three Bezirksligen of Erfurt, Gera and Suhl. Each of those three leagues contributed a number of clubs to the new league while one club was relegated from the DDR-Liga, then the second division. The Thüringenliga was established within the East German football league system and incorporated in the league system of the united Germany at the end of its first season, in 1991.

The league has been a feeder league, together with the Sachsenliga and Verbandsliga Sachsen-Anhalt, to the NOFV-Oberliga Süd, which its champion is directly promoted to. As such, it was the fourth tier of the German league system.

After having fourteen clubs in the league in its first season, the number went to seventeen the year after and was then set at sixteen, which it maintained for most seasons. It some years the number does however vary to balance out promotion and relegation.

In 1994, with the establishment of the Regionalliga Nordost as the new third tier of the league system, the Thüringenliga fell to tier five in the system but remained unchanged otherwise.

In 2008, the league was again demoted one level when the 3. Liga was established. However, this changed nothing in the leagues status as a feeder league to the NOFV-Oberliga.

The Landesligen of Thuringia and Saxony are unique in their naming as every other league in Germany of this standing carries the name Verbandsliga. This was done so simply by choice of the local football associations (German:Fußballverband) in Saxony and Thuringia and the name could be changed to Verbandsliga if they wish to do so.

League champions
The league champions:

 Denotes club declined or ineligible for promotion.

Founding members of the league
The league was established from fourteen clubs from four leagues in 1990. Most of the East German clubs changed their names in the years after the reunion, some reverting to their old ones after a brief period. Current names, when different, are listed alongside the name in 1990. The clubs are:

From the 2nd Division-Group B:
 FC Union Mühlhausen

From the Bezirksliga Erfurt:
 SV Funkwerk Kölleda, now FSV 06 Kölleda
 Glückauf Sondershausen, now BSV Eintracht Sondershausen
 SC Leinefelde
 Grün-Weiß Erfurt
 Preußen Bad Langensalza
 SV Motor Gotha, now FSV Wacker 03 Gotha

From the Bezirksliga Gera:
 FV Zeulenroda, now FC Motor Zeulenroda again
 Blau-Weiß Gera, later FV Gera Süd, now BSG Wismut Gera again
 SV Jenaer Glaswerk, now SV Schott Jena

From the Bezirksliga Suhl:
 SV EK Veilsdorf
 SV 04 Schmalkalden, now FSV Schmalkalden
 Lok Meiningen, now VfL 04 Meiningen
 Versco Walldorf, now SV Walldorf

References

Sources
 Deutschlands Fußball in Zahlen,  An annual publication with tables and results from the Bundesliga to Verbandsliga/Landesliga. DSFS.
 Kicker Almanach,  The yearbook on German football from Bundesliga to Oberliga, since 1937. Kicker Sports Magazine.
 Die Deutsche Liga-Chronik 1945-2005  History of German football from 1945 to 2005 in tables. DSFS. 2006.

External links 
 Das deutsche Fussball Archiv  Historic German league tables
 The North East German Football Association (NOFV)  
 The Thuringia Football Association (TFV)  

Landesliga
Football competitions in Thuringia
1990 establishments in East Germany
Sports leagues established in 1990